Douglas Dean Osheroff (born August 1, 1945) is an American physicist known for his work in experimental condensed matter physics, in particular for his co-discovery of superfluidity in Helium-3. For his contributions he shared the 1996 Nobel Prize in Physics along with David Lee and Robert C. Richardson. Osheroff is currently the J. G. Jackson and C. J. Wood Professor of Physics, Emeritus at Stanford University.

Life and work
Osheroff was born in Aberdeen, Washington. His father, William Osheroff, was the son of Jewish immigrants who left Russia. His mother, Bessie Anne (Ondov), a nurse, was the daughter of Slovak immigrants (her own father was a Lutheran minister). from the Felvidék,Upper Hungary, Kingdom of Hungary.
Osheroff was confirmed in the Lutheran Church but he was given the chance to choose and decided not to attend any longer. He has stated "In some sense it seemed that lying in church is the worst place to lie. I guess at some emotional level I accept the idea of God, but I don't know how God would manifest itself."

Osheroff earned his bachelor's degree in 1967 from Caltech, where he attended lectures by Richard Feynman and did undergraduate research for Gerry Neugebauer.

Osheroff joined the Laboratory of Atomic and Solid State Physics at Cornell University as a graduate student, doing research in low-temperature physics.  Together with David Lee, the head of the laboratory, and Robert C. Richardson, Osheroff used a Pomeranchuk cell to investigate the behaviour of 3He at temperatures within a few thousandths of a degree of absolute zero.  They discovered unexpected effects in their measurements, which they eventually explained as phase transitions to a superfluid phase of 3He.  Lee, Richardson and Osheroff were jointly awarded the Nobel Prize in Physics in 1996 for this discovery.

Osheroff received a Ph.D. from Cornell University in 1973. He then worked at Bell Labs in Murray Hill, New Jersey for 15 years, continuing to research low-temperature phenomena in 3He.  In 1987 he moved to the Departments of Physics and Applied Physics at Stanford University, where he also served as department chair from 1993-96.  His research is focused on phenomena that occur at extremely low temperatures.

Osheroff was selected to serve on the Space Shuttle Columbia investigation panel, serving much the same role as Richard Feynman did on the Space Shuttle Challenger panel.

He currently serves on the board of advisors of Scientists and Engineers for America, an organization focused on promoting sound science in American government.

Osheroff is left-handed, and he often blames his slight quirks and eccentricities on it. He is also an avid photographer and introduces students at Stanford to medium-format film photography in a freshman seminar titled "Technical Aspects of Photography." In addition, he has taught the Stanford introductory physics course on electricity and magnetism on multiple occasions, most recently in Spring 2008, as well as undergraduate labs on low temperature physics.

Among his physics outreach activities, Osheroff participated in the science festivals for middle and high school students, is an official guest of honor at the International Young Physicists' Tournament 2013.

He married a biochemist, Phyllis Liu-Osheroff, in 1970.

Osheroff is one of the 20 American recipients of the Nobel Prize in Physics to sign a letter addressed to President George W. Bush in May 2008, urging him to "reverse the damage done to basic science research in the Fiscal Year 2008 Omnibus Appropriations Bill" by requesting additional emergency funding for the Department of Energy’s Office of Science, the National Science Foundation, and the National Institute of Standards and Technology.

Awards and honors
 Nobel Prize in Physics (1996)
 Simon Memorial Prize (1976)
 Oliver E. Buckley Condensed Matter Prize (1981)
 MacArthur Fellowship Program (1981)
 Golden Plate Award of the American Academy of Achievement (1997)

See also

Timeline of low-temperature technology

References

External links

Stanford Physics Department - Osheroff 
 including the Nobel Lecture, December 7, 1996 Superfluidity in 3He: Discovery and Understandning
Osheroff Learning of his Nobel Prize - Osheroff released this recording from his answering machine, which showed his initial annoyance with a 2.30am phone call.
Freeview video interview with Douglas Osheroff by the Vega Science Trust

1945 births
Living people
Nobel laureates in Physics
American Nobel laureates
21st-century American physicists
Jewish physicists
Jewish American scientists
Scientists at Bell Labs
Members of the United States National Academy of Sciences
Fellows of the American Physical Society
MacArthur Fellows
Cornell University alumni
Cornell Laboratory of Atomic and Solid State Physics
Stanford University Department of Applied Physics faculty
California Institute of Technology alumni
People from Aberdeen, Washington
American people of Russian-Jewish descent
American people of Slovak descent
Oliver E. Buckley Condensed Matter Prize winners
Superfluidity